Adolf Davids (19 October 1867 – 9 August 1963) was a German fencer. He competed in the individual foil event at the 1912 Summer Olympics.

References

1867 births
1963 deaths
German male fencers
Olympic fencers of Germany
Fencers at the 1912 Summer Olympics